Türgen is a sum (district) of Uvs Province in western Mongolia.

The center of the sum lies on the banks of the Türgen River in the valley between the Kharkhiraa and the Türgen mountains. It is about 35 km NW of Ulaangom, along the highway to the Russian border.

Populated places in Mongolia
Districts of Uvs Province